Leptorhabdium illyricum is the species of the Lepturinae subfamily in the biological species known as the long-horned beetle family. This beetle is distributed in Bosnia and Herzegovina, Croatia, Greece, Italy, Montenegro, North Macedonia, and in Slovenia.

References

Lepturinae
Beetles described in 1870